James Connor (born 5 May 1995) is an Australian diver.

He competed at the 2012 Summer Olympics in the Men's 10 metre platform event, failing to advance to the semi-finals after classifying 20th in the preliminaries.

James began his diving career at the age of 8, at the Ringwood Aquatic Centre, and is a member of the Gannets Diving Club.

His more notable results include a gold medal at the 2011 Australian Swimming Championships in the 10 m synchro event with his partner Ethan Warren; as well as becoming a centurion at the Rage in 2017. He also won a silver in the 3 m synchro and a bronze in the 3 m individual springboard on the same occasion. Connor also participated in the 2010 Commonwealth Games where he finished 9th in the 10 metre platform.  James also won first place in the 10m platform at the 2009 British Elite Junior Championships, and second in the 3m springboard at the same event.

See also
 List of Caulfield Grammar School people

References

External links 
James Connor's profile on the London 2012 Olympics website
The aquatic and waterslide centre where James first dived.

Divers at the 2012 Summer Olympics
Olympic divers of Australia
Living people
1995 births
Divers at the 2016 Summer Olympics
Divers at the 2018 Commonwealth Games
Australian male divers
People educated at Caulfield Grammar School
Commonwealth Games medallists in diving
Commonwealth Games silver medallists for Australia
Commonwealth Games bronze medallists for Australia
People from Redland City
20th-century Australian people
21st-century Australian people
People from Clayton, Victoria
Divers from Melbourne
Sportsmen from Victoria (Australia)
Medallists at the 2018 Commonwealth Games